The 47th Biathlon World Championships was held in Kontiolahti, Finland from 5 March to 15 March 2015.

There were a total of 11 competitions: sprint, pursuit, individual, mass start, and relay races for men and women, and mixed relay. All the events during this championships also counted for the 2014–15 Biathlon World Cup season.

Schedule
All times are local (UTC+2).

Medal winners

Men

Women

Mixed

Medal table

Top nations

Top athletes
All athletes with three or more medals.

References

External links

IBU Site

 
2015
Biathlon World Championships
Biathlon World Championships
2015 Biathlon World Championships
2015 Biathlon World Championships
March 2015 sports events in Europe
Biathlon competitions in Finland